The 1994–95 South Midlands League season was 66th in the history of South Midlands League.

Premier Division

The Premier Division featured 14 clubs which competed in the division last season, along with 2 new clubs:
Royston Town, resigned from Isthmian League Division Three
Dunstable United

League table

Senior Division

The Senior Division featured 12 clubs which competed in the division last season, along with 2 new clubs, promoted from last season's Division One: 
Stony Stratford Town
Delco

Also Delco changed their name to ACD Tridon.

League table

Division One

The Division One featured 10 clubs which competed in the division last season, along with 4 new clubs:
Kent Athletic
Bow Brickhill
Abbey National
Clifton Old Boys

League table

References

1994–95
8